PLOS Biology is a monthly peer-reviewed scientific journal covering all aspects of biology. Publication began on October 13, 2003. It is the first journal published by the Public Library of Science. The editor-in-chief is Nonia Pariente.

In addition to research articles, the journal publishes magazine content aimed to be accessible to a broad audience. Article types in this section are essays, "unsolved mysteries", editorials, and synopses.

Abstracting and indexing
The journal is abstracted and indexed in:
Biological Abstracts
BIOSIS Previews
Current Contents/Agriculture, Biology & Environmental Sciences
Current Contents/Life Sciences
Chemical Abstracts Service
Embase
Index Medicus/MEDLINE/PubMed
Science Citation Index
Scopus
The Zoological Record

According to Journal Citation Reports, the journal had a 2019 impact factor of 7.076. The journal does not list this impact factor on its website. Instead, the journal promotes the use of article level metrics to provide a measure of the impact of their published articles.

References

External links

Biology journals
Creative Commons Attribution-licensed journals
Publications established in 2003
PLOS academic journals
Monthly journals